Vice Admiral P Murugesan is a former Flag Officer of the Indian Navy. He served as the Vice Chief of the Naval Staff (VCNS) from March 2015 to March 2016.

Education

Career
Murugesan was the Chief of Staff of the Western Naval Command and Chief of Personnel at New Delhi. Commissioned into the Indian Navy on 01 Jan 1979, the Flag Officer is a specialist in Navigation and Direction and an alumnus of the Naval Command College, Newport, USA. His Command tenures include Commands of Indian Naval Ships Ranjit, INS Gharial (L23) and Agray, the last two of which he had the honor of Commissioning into the Indian Navy.

His key staff appointments before flag rank include, Principal Director of Naval Operations, Naval Attache to Washington, USA, and Directing Staff at DSSC, Wellington and College of Naval Warfare, Mumbai. As a Flag Officer, he has held the appointments of Assistant Chief of Personnel (Human Resource Development), Flag Officer Commanding Eastern Fleet and Assistant Chief of Naval Staff (Foreign Cooperation and Intelligence).

Awards
Vice Admiral P Murugesan has been awarded with the Ati Vishist Seva Medal and the Vishisht Seva Medal in 2011 and 2008 respectively.

References

Living people
Indian Navy admirals
Flag Officers Commanding Eastern Fleet
Year of birth missing (living people)
Chiefs of Personnel (India)
Naval War College alumni
Indian naval attachés